Rachelle Ferrell is the second eponymous studio album by American vocalist Rachelle Ferrell. It was released on September 12, 1992 through Capitol Records.

Track listing

Charts

Weekly charts

Year-end charts

Certifications

References

External links 

1992 albums
Capitol Records albums
Albums produced by George Duke
Albums produced by Michael J. Powell